Caranavi Airport  is an airport serving the town of Caranavi in the La Paz Department of Bolivia. The runway also serves as Civica Street, a main street in the center of the town.

Caranavi is in the moderately narrow valley of the Coroico River, with high terrain in all quadrants.

See also

Transport in Bolivia
List of airports in Bolivia

References

External links
OpenStreetMap - Caranavi
OurAirports - Caranavi
FallingRain - Caranavi Airport

Airports in La Paz Department (Bolivia)